The 1967 edition of the Campeonato Carioca kicked off on August 23, 1967 and ended on December 17, 1967. It was organized by FCF (Federação Carioca de Futebol, or Carioca Football Federation). Twelve teams participated. Botafogo won the title for the 13th time. no teams were relegated.

System
The tournament would be divided in two stages:
 First round: The twelve teams all played in a single round-robin format against each other. The eight best teams in each group qualified to the Second round.
 Second round: The remaining eight teams all played in a single round-robin format against each other. The team with the most points won the title.

Championship

First round

Second round

Taça Guanabara

Playoffs

References

Campeonato Carioca seasons
Carioca